Alp Sol Tepek (Pinyin: Tǎbù Hézú) was a Tarkhan of the Yenisei Kyrgyz Khaganate who lived in the first half of the 9th century.

Etymology

For the first time Alp Sol is mentioned in 842 in the Chinese source «Old Book of Tang» as «Tapu Hezu». In November 842, envoy Tapu Hezu arrived at the border fortress of the Tiandejun province from the Kyrgyz Khagan with a letter informing him that, having no information about the fate of the princess
Taihe, the Khagan sent a military detachment to look for her. The Kyrgyz sent General Tapu Hezu and others to the fortress of the Tiande province, in addition, they announced that they would move to the Helo River to live in the old territory of the Uyghur Khaganate. In addition, five tribes submitted to them - Kuqa, Beshbaliq, Tatars and others. Emperor Tang rejoiced at the arrival of the Kyrgyz envoy and placed him above the envoy from Balhae.

In the summer of 1915, Russian scientist Boris Vladimirtsov discovered a runic rock inscription in the Tes River Valley (Northwestern Mongolia). The original interpretation of the translation turned out to be incorrect, in 1969 and 1975 the Soviet scientist Sergei Klyashtorny conducted a thorough study and published the correct interpretation of the inscription.

This inscription is connected with the conquests of the Yenisei Kyrgyz in the 840s.

Life

Little is known of Alp Sol's early life. In 840, he commanded the left wing of the Kyrgyz army during the siege of Ordu Baliq. Alp Sol commanded a campaign in Tibet and East Turkestan in 840–843. In 843, the Tang emperor Wuzung expressed gratitude to the Kyrgyz Khagan for rescuing Princess Taihe.

 

In 842, Alp Sol conquered the tribal union of the Tatars, as evidenced by the runic inscription on the river Uibat.

After the defeat of the Uyghur Khaganate in 840, the Kyrgyz faced the Mongol-speaking Tatars. The Kyrgyz, having defeated the hostile Tatars, captured as trophies their women, whose husbands fell in battle. According to custom, Tatar slaves became the property of Kyrgyz men.

The so-called «Great Campaign» is reflected in the Kyrgyz epic Manas. In 842–843, Alp Sol, pursuing the surviving Tatars, invaded the Tang province of Gansu and plundered it, this is evidenced by a runic inscription found in Tuva.

In 840–843, Alp Sol conducted a military campaign in East Turkestan, the purpose of which was to extend the power of the Kyrgyz Khagan in this region and to destroy the surviving groups of Uyghurs. For 3 years, the Kyrgyz troops under his command captured the cities of Kuqa, Karasahr, Turpan and Beshbaliq, the tribes of East Turkestan were also conquered. Kyrgyz detachments also conducted successful operations in the Tian Shan and Jeti Suu.

In 843–847, the Kyrgyz conducted successful campaigns in Eastern Mongolia, Transbaikal and Western Manchuria. Alp Sol conquered the tribes of Transbaikal, Eastern Mongolia and carried out successful operations against the troops of Enian Qaghan and Wujie Qaghan.

Alp Sol made a significant contribution to the formation of a new nomadic empire, he led the conquests of the Kyrgyz in 840-847 and brought the Yenisei Kyrgyz Khaganate to its peak. He was a skilled diplomat and always defended the interests of the Kyrgyz state. His possessions were on the territory of modern Tuva.

Legacy
 Some scholars consider Alp Sol to be the prototype of the protagonist of the Kyrgyz epic «Manas».
 Some scholars associate Alp Sol with the Khakass epic «Chize Khan Solagai».

References

History of Kyrgyzstan
9th-century Turkic people
9th-century deaths
Year of birth unknown
Military leaders